USS Pomfret (SS-391), a  submarine, was a ship of the United States Navy named for the pomfret, a fish of the seabream family which is a powerful and speedy swimmer, capable of operating at great depths.

Construction and commissioning
Pomfret was laid down 14 July 1943 and launched 27 October 1943 by the Portsmouth Navy Yard, in Kittery, Maine, sponsored by Miss Marilyn Maloney, daughter of Senator Francis Maloney; and commissioned 19 February 1944.

World War II 

After training, the new submarine arrived at Pearl Harbor 1 June 1944. She departed Pearl Harbor 23 June and proceeded via Midway to her first patrol area—the east coast of Kyūshū and Bungo Suido. On 6 July she made an emergency dive when attacked by a Japanese plane. On 12 July she allowed a Japanese hospital ship to proceed in peace. After attempting an attack on a battleship, she arrived at Midway 16 August.

On 10 September she departed Midway for the Luzon Straits-South China Sea area to conduct her second patrol. She sighted two enemy battleships on 26 September, but their speed and the presence of an enemy submarine prevented an attack.

On 2 October Pomfret sank Tsuyama Maru, a 6,962-ton passenger-cargo vessel. After the usual depth charging, she departed for Saipan and moored in Tanapag Harbor 12 October.

After refit and training, Pomfret reentered the same patrol area 1 November as part of a wolf pack, with Cdr. John B. Hess now commanding. Pomfret sank Atlas Maru, 7,347-tons and Hamburg Maru, 5,271-tons. On 25 November, she sank Japanese Patrol Boat No.38 and cargo ship Shōhō Maru, 1,356-tons. Pomfret departed the area and proceeded via Midway to Pearl Harbor.

The submarine began her fourth patrol 25 January 1945 in another wolf pack. The mission was a picket boat sweep ahead of a carrier task force soon to strike the Tokyo-Nagoya area. After completing the sweep without encountering any picket boats, she moved south of Honshū for lifeguard work.

On 16 February she rescued a pilot from the aircraft carrier ,  Lieutenant (jg) Joe Farrel. The incident was described in "Silent Victory" by Clay Blair (Lippincott, 1975) as follows:

That day she also captured two prisoners. Unsuccessfully attacked by a Japanese destroyer on 10 March, she departed the area 23 March and arrived at Midway on 30 March. Departing Midway 26 April for the Kuril Islands-Okhotsk Sea area, she entered the area 5 May. On 26 May she fired torpedoes at an enemy anti-submarine hunter-killer group, but scored no hits. She returned to Midway 7 June.

On 2 July she departed for her sixth war patrol. After lifeguard duty south of Honshū, she began patrol in the East China Sea. On 19 July she sank the first of 44 floating mines. On 24 July, she shelled the Kuskaki Jima lighthouse and radio installations and, on 26 July, she destroyed a three-masted junk and a small schooner. On 8 August she rescued the entire five-man crew of a B-25 bomber. Pomfret continued to shell small craft and pick up Japanese and Korean survivors until the cessation of hostilities 15 August 1945. The following day she headed for Guam. On 9 September she arrived at San Francisco.

Post-war service 

On 2 January 1946 Pomfret departed Mare Island Naval Shipyard for Guam, arriving 22 January 1946. She proceeded to Subic Bay, Philippine Islands 9 March, and from there steamed to Tsingtao, China where for six weeks she acted as target for U.S. antisubmarine warfare vessels based at Tsingtao. On 18 May she returned to Pearl Harbor, her new homeport. During the next three years, she made two tours of duty in Western Pacific: the first, April to August 1947, and the second, December 1948 to April 1949.

Jimmy Carter, future President of the United States (1977–1981), served aboard Pomfret from 17 December 1948 to 1 February 1951 as his first shipboard assignment.  Carter is the only U.S. president to have qualified as a submariner.  During this period Pomfret deployed to the Western Pacific Ocean and conducted operations in the waters off Japan and the coast of China.

In 1950 Pomfret arrived in San Diego. She operated along the United States West Coast until February 1951, participated in the Korean War until September and returned to San Diego to operate locally. Pomfret decommissioned in April 1952 for conversion at Mare Island to a Guppy IIA submarine. After conversion, she recommissioned 5 December and in the ensuing years alternated between coastal operations off San Diego and Western Pacific deployments.

She departed for Far Eastern waters 7 July 1967 on a cruise which included anti-submarine warfare exercises in the Gulf of Tonkin off Vietnam. She returned to San Diego 23 January 1968 and spent most of that year in exercises off San Diego.

TCG Oruçreis (S 337) 

In 1971, transfers to the Turkish Navy were resumed, starting with Pomfret. After three months of training, she was transferred on 1 July in San Diego, and renamed TCG Oruçreis (S 337), after the great Ottoman seaman Oruç Reis. Her new crew sailed to the Philadelphia Naval Yard for an overhaul, and then, before sailing to Turkey, she took part in ASW training in Key West, Florida between 27 February – 22 March 1972. Oruçreis was commissioned on 3 May 1972. Ex-Pomfret was purchased outright by Turkey and simultaneously struck from the US Naval Register, 1 August 1973.

She served in the Turkish Navy until 1987.

Awards
 Asiatic-Pacific Campaign Medal with five battle stars 
 World War II Victory Medal
 Navy Occupation Medal
 China Service Medal
 National Defense Service Medal with star
 Armed Forces Expeditionary Medal
 Vietnam Service Medal with two campaign stars
 Republic of Vietnam Campaign Medal

Commemoration
Pomfret′s ship's bell is located in the officer's club of Dugway Proving Ground in Utah.

References

External links 

 
  History of Turkish Submarines

 

Balao-class submarines
Ships built in Kittery, Maine
1943 ships
World War II submarines of the United States
Cold War submarines of the United States
Korean War submarines of the United States
Vietnam War submarines of the United States
Ships transferred from the United States Navy to the Turkish Navy
Balao-class submarines of the Turkish Navy